Arecomyces is a genus of fungi in the family Hyponectriaceae.

Species
As accepted by Species Fungorum;

Arecomyces attaleae 
Arecomyces bruneiensis 
Arecomyces calami 
Arecomyces dicksonii 
Arecomyces epigenus 
Arecomyces frondicola 
Arecomyces hedgeri 
Arecomyces licualae 
Arecomyces sekoyae 
Arecomyces tetrasporus

References

External links
Index Fungorum

Xylariales